Darvaz (also Romanized as Darvāz; also known as Darvāzeh Dīlakh) is a village in Khoshabar Rural District, in the Central District of Rezvanshahr County, Gilan Province, Iran. At the 2006 census, its population was 620, in 147 families.

References 

Populated places in Rezvanshahr County